One Minute Wonders is the name given to a series of piano pieces by leading British composers, commissioned by the pianist Clive Williamson in association with the University of Surrey. The challenge, laid down to all contributing composers, was that submitted compositions had to last no longer than 60 seconds (although, in practice, several pieces exceeded the time limit). Contributing composers included Colin Matthews, John Woolrich, Julian Anderson, Matthew King, Tansy Davies, Steve Goss and Michael Finnissy. Many of the compositions were premiered at a concert at the University of Surrey in 2005. Anthony Payne, writing in Country Life Magazine, wrote:Particularly remarkable were Matthew King's Sonatas which managed to quote from all of Beethoven's sonatas in chronological order, and Colin Matthews's 60 Second Waltz, which, after half-remembering Chopin, faded modernistically, then resurrected itself.One Minute Wonders is published, and a CD by the same name has been released (with Clive Williamson as soloist) by Cadenza Music.

Sources

External links
Stephen Goss, writing about One Minute Wonders

Compositions for solo piano
Collaborations in classical music